Bothwell railway station served the village of Bothwell, South Lanarkshire, Scotland from 1878 to 1955 on the Glasgow, Bothwell, Hamilton and Coatbridge Railway.

History 
The station opened on 1 April 1878 by the North British Railway. To the south were sidings to Bothwell Castle Colliery, with the colliery to the west of the station. These were controlled by Bothwell Station signal box, which was replaced in 1896. The station closed on 1 January 1917 but reopened on 2 June 1919, before closing permanently to passengers on 4 July 1955. It closed to goods on 6 June 1961.

References

External links 

Disused railway stations in South Lanarkshire
Former North British Railway stations
Railway stations in Great Britain opened in 1878
Railway stations in Great Britain closed in 1917
Railway stations in Great Britain opened in 1919
Railway stations in Great Britain closed in 1955
1878 establishments in Scotland
1955 disestablishments in Scotland
Bothwell and Uddingston